G34 may refer to:
 Socket G34, a CPU socket designed by AMD to support AMD's multi-chip module Opteron 6000-series server processors
 G-34, a form of gastrin
 Grumman G-34,  a prototype of a twin-engine shipboard fighter interceptor